KK Mursa is Croatian women's basketball club in Osijek.

Notable former players
Sena Pavetić
Davorka Balić
Ana Božić
Simona Šoda

External links
Profile at eurobasket.com

Women's basketball teams in Croatia
Sport in Osijek
Basketball teams established in 1975